Beary or Byari (ಬ್ಯಾರಿ ಬಾಸೆ Byāri Bāse) is a Dravidian language spoken by the Muslim communities mainly of Karnataka (Dakshina Kannada and Udupi districts) and extreme northern end of Kerala like Manjeshwaram, Kunjathur, Uppala, Hosangadi of Kasaragod district (Byaris). Bearys speak a language made of Malayalam idioms with Tulu phonology and grammar. This language is traditionally known as Mappila Bashe because of Bearys' close contact with Mappila, the Malayali Muslims. Due to the intensive influence of Tulu for centuries, it is today considered close to both Tulu and Malayalam.

Features
The language uses the Arabic and Kannada alphabets for writing. Being a distant cousin of other dialects of Malayalam and surrounded by other linguistic groups for centuries, mainly Tulu, the dialect exhibits ancient features as well as modern innovations not seen in other well-known dialects of Malayalam.
Surrounded by Tulu-speaking populations, the impact of Tulu on the phonological, morphological and syntactic structure of the dialect is evident.
Professor BM Ichlangod by his recent research work on the Beary dialect proved that, it was one of the independent South Indian Dravidian dialect having derived from Malayalam and also rarely Bearies used a script known as Vatteluthu.

Distinction of ḻ, ṇ, ṟ
Sounds peculiar to Malayalam such as 'ḻ', 'ṇ', 'ṟ' are not found in this dialect. 'ḷ' and  'ṇ'  are merged with l and n, respectively. 'ṟ' is merged with r and tt, 'tt' to t. This resembles Tulu.

v > b
The initial v of standard Malayalam corresponds to an initial b in Beary Bashe.
The same change has taken place in Tulu, too.

 Some dialects.
 This orthographic representation is phonemic. On a phonetic level, it often becomes , which is closer to the Tulu and Beary Bashe forms. This occurs because of a rule whereby voiced plosive consonants are intervocalic allophones of their unvoiced counterparts. However, this only applies to native Dravidian words, and as vāṭaka is a Sanskrit loanword, the prescriptively correct pronunciation is indeed .

Distinction of 'a' and 'e'
The final 'a' of standard Malayalam corresponds to the final 'e' in Beary Bashe.

Distinction of 'n' and 'm'
The word final 'n' and 'm' of standard Malayalam are dropped in Beary Bashe.

Degeminated consonants
Geminated consonants occurring after a long vowel and also after a second short vowel of a word in standard Malayalam get degeminated in Beary Bashe.

Lexical relations
Almost all lexical items in Beary Bashe can be related to corresponding lexical items in Malayalam, Tulu or Perso-Arabic origin.
However, some equivalents can only be found in Mappila dialects of Malayalam in Kerala.

Person endings
Verbs in old Dravidian languages did not have any person marking. Person endings of verbs observed in modern Dravidian languages are later innovations.
Malayalam is the only Dravidian language that does not show any verbal person suffixes, so Malayalam verbs can be said to represent the original stage of Dravidian verbs (though Old Malayalam did have verbal person suffixes at some point). Person suffixes in Beary Bashe closely resemble those of Tulu, although the past tense in this dialect agrees with that of standard Malayalam in shape as well as in the distribution of allomorphs.

Arabic influence 
Beary Bashe is strongly influenced by the Arabic language. Nativised Arabic words are very common in everyday speech, especially in coastal areas. Saan, Pinhana, Gubboosu, Dabboosu, Pattir, Rakkasi, Seintaan, and Kayeen are a few examples of Beary words with Arabic roots. Beary Bashe also has words related to Tamil and Malayalam. Tamil and Malayalam Speakers can understand Beary up to an extent of 75%.

Literature 

The Bearys of the coast have produced a rich body of literary works in both Beary Bashe and Kannada. Beary literature comprises poetry, research articles on Bearys, historical analysis of Dakshina Kannada Muslims, essays, stories and other genres of literature. "English-Kannada-Beary" dictionary is also available in the market produced by Dr. A. Wahhab Doddamane. A number of notable Beary littérateurs have contributed to enrich the Beary literature. Dr. Susheela P. Upadhyaya, an eminent scholar has made a comprehensive study in finding the roots of Beary literature. Dr. A. Wahhab Doddamane has produced a book entitled The Muslims of Dakshina Kannada, which is an informative documentary work.

The Bearys have also produced a number of magazines and periodicals from Mangalore and other cities of the district. Some periodicals have become popular and a few of them have become a part of Beary history. Generally Kannada script is used to produce Beary literature. More than a 100 books, 400 audio cassettes and 2 video albums have been brought out so far.

Lyrics
Bearys have brought out numerous lyrics and songs in Beary Bashe. Beary songwriters and music composers have published a number of Beary albums, thousands of copies in electronic format have already been sold.

Folk songs
The Beary Bashe has its own songs and 'ghazals'. Although it is unique in its nature the songs bore resemblance to Moplah Patts (Mappila Songs). The Beary folk songs were rendered during marriage (Mangila) parties, and for many other occasions. Kolkkali patt is a song sung during a cultural play called Kolata which uses short sticks in both the hands while playing, Unjal patt is sung by the girls during the occasion of putting the child to cradle, Moyilanji patt is sung during marriage ceremonies.

Unfortunately modern day Bearys do not know the folk songs sung by their ancestors. Several Beary folk games have also vanished.
 
One of the folk songs sung by Beary women to tease the bride during her wedding celebrations is "appa chudu chudu patima". The first few lines are:

List of the books published in Beary Bashe 

 *These books are available at the largest library in the world, the Library of Congress at Washington, D.C., United States.

Beary language films
The first Beary-language feature film Byari shared the award for the best feature film at the 59th Indian National Film Awards.

The inaugural ceremony of first Beary language video movie, Mami Marmolu was held in Mangalore on 22 October 2008.  The film is being produced by Sony Enterprises, B.S. Gangadhara is the producer of the film. The film will focus on social and family problems being faced by the Beary families. Rahim Uchil has written the story, screen play, dialogue of the film. The director of this first Beary movie is Rahim Uchil while Prakash Padubidri is the assistant director. Rajesh Haleangady will be the cinematographer and music is being provided by Ravindra Prabhu.

The movie stars Vaibhavi (Gulsha Fawzia Begum), Rahim Uchil, Veena Mangalore, Roopashri Varkady, Riyana, K. K. Gatti, Ashok Bikernakatte, Ibrahim Thanneerbhavi, Riyaz, Sujnesh and Imtiyaz. Retired Police officer G. A. Bava will also have a role. Film will be shot in and around Mangalore city including Maripalla and Pilikula.

Beary Sahitya Sammelana (Literary Summit of Bearys)

There are four Beary Sahitya Sammelanas (The Beary Literature Summit) have been taken place so far. Cultural activities, exhibition related to Beary culture and society, talks on Beary society by Beary scholars, publications and Beary literature stalls are the centre of attraction during any Beary Sahitya Sammelana.

The first Beary Sahitya Sammelana was presided by B.M. Iddinabba, Member of Legislative Assembly, Ullal constituency, Karnataka State.
The second Beary Sahitya Sammelana was presided by Golthamajalu Abdul Khader Haji.
The third Beary Sahitya Sammelana was presided by Beary research scholar Prof. B.M. Ichlangod.
The Fourth Beary Sahitya Sammelana was presided by novelist Fakir Mohammed Katpady.

Fourth Beary Sahitya Sammelana
The Fourth Beary Sahitya Sammelana (The Fourth Beary Literary Summit), held
in Vokkaligara Samaja Bhavana in the city of Chikmagalur on 27 February 2007 which demanded that the state government establish a Beary Sahitya Academy. The Sammelana was jointly organized by Kendra Beary Sahitya Parishat, Mangalore, and Chickmagalur Bearygala Okkoota. Chikmagalur is the district that harbors the second largest Beary population, next to Dakshina Kannada.

The theme of the Sammelana was Prosperity through Literature, Development through Education and Integrity for Security. 

The sammelana also took up issues such as official recognition to the Beary Bashe by the state government, setting up of Beary Sahitya Academy, and recognition to the community as a linguistic minority. The history of this dialect is at least 1200 years old.

See also
 Beary
 Malayalam
 Arabi Malayalam
 Ahmed Noori
 Mygurudu secret-language from Malabar Muslims of Northern Kerala

Notes

References

Islamic culture
Languages of Karnataka
Languages of Kerala
Malayalam language
Arabi Malayalam